Ken Hedt (15 November 1936 – 16 May 2006) was an Australian rules footballer, who played in the Victorian Football League for Collingwood.

Ken Hedt played a full season in 1956 the year he made his league career only. He, as a winger, had to be taken off injured in the second quarter of the losing 1956 Grand Final against Melbourne.

He has four children and two grandchildren.

References

External links

Australian rules footballers from Victoria (Australia)
Collingwood Football Club players
1936 births
2006 deaths